List of the promotions of the cardinals of the Holy Roman Church. Dates of the consistories are known or possible to establish only from the pontificate of Pope Gelasius II (1118–1119). Information concerning the number and names of the cardinals created before this pontificate are certainly incomplete. For the later period, the available data are probably complete, but, for some pontificates (particularly in the 12th century), it is impossible to establish the exact number of promotions, because in some cases there are doubts whether the promotion really took place, and in some others it is not possible to ascertain whether the records describe two separate individuals or one individual who held two cardinal titles during his lifetime.

The numbers in the list do not include the cardinals created in pectore whose names were never published, those who declined the appointment, and those who died before their announced promotion took place.

Until 1118

From 1118

See also 

College of Cardinals

Notes

Bibliography
 

Konrad Eubel, Hierarchia Catholica, vol. I-VI, Münster 1913-1960
Otto Kares, Chronologie der Kardinalbischöfe im elften Jahrhundert, (in:) Festschrift zur Jahrhundertfeier des Gymnasiums am Burgplatz in Essen, Essen 1924
Barbara Zenker, Die Mitglieder des Kardinalkollegiums von 1130 bis 1159, Würzburg 1964
Hans Walter Klewitz, Reformpapsttum und Kardinalkolleg, Darmstadt 1957
Rudolf Hüls, Kardinäle, Klerus und Kirchen Roms: 1049–1130 Bibliothek des Deutschen Historischen Instituts in Rom. Tübingen: Max Niemeyer Verlag, 1977
Elfriede Kartusch, Das Kardinalskollegium in der Zeit von 1181-1227, Wien 1948
Johannes M. Brixius, Die Mitglieder des Kardinalkollegiums von 1130-1181, Berlin 1912
Werner Maleczek, Papst und Kardinalskolleg von 1191 bis 1216, Wien 1984
Klaus Ganzer, Die Entwicklung des auswärtigen Kardinalats im hohen Mittelalter, Bibliothek des Deutschen Historischen Instituts in Rom. Tübingen: Max Niemeyer Verlag 1963
Agostino Paravicini Bagliani, Cardinali di curia e "familiae" cardinalizie dal 1227 al 1254, Padova 1972
J. P. Migne: Patrologia Latina
Giandomenico Mansi, «Sacrorum Conciliorum Nova Amplissima Collectio»
Phillipp Jaffé, Regesta pontificum Romanorum ab condita Ecclesia ad annum post Christum natum MCXCVIII, vol. I-II. Leipzig 1885-1888
Paul Fridolin Kehr: Regesta pontificum Romanorum. Italia Pontificia. Vol. I–X SUL Books in the Public Domain
Pius Bonifatius Gams, Series episcoporum Ecclesiae catholicae, quotquot innotuerunt a beato Petro apostolo Wielkopolska Biblioteka Cyfrowa

+
Lists of cardinals
+